The 2022 Copa Sudamericana group stage was played from 5 April to 26 May 2022. A total of 32 teams competed in the group stage to decide eight of the 16 places in the final stages of the 2022 Copa Sudamericana.

Draw

The draw for the group stage was held on 25 March 2022, 12:00 PYST (UTC−3), at the CONMEBOL Convention Centre in Luque, Paraguay.Teams were seeded by their CONMEBOL Clubs ranking as of 16 December 2021 (shown in parentheses), taking into account the following three factors:
Performance in the last 10 years, taking into account Copa Libertadores and Copa Sudamericana results in the period 2012–2021.
Historical coefficient, taking into account Copa Libertadores and Copa Sudamericana results in the period 1960–2011 and 2002–2011 respectively.
Local tournament champion, with bonus points awarded to domestic league champions of the last 10 years.
For the group stage, the 32 teams were drawn into eight groups (Groups A–H) of four containing a team from each of the four pots. Teams from the same association could not be drawn into the same group.

Notes

The following are the four losers of the third stage of the 2022 Copa Libertadores qualifying stages which joined the 12 direct entrants and the 16 Copa Sudamericana first stage winners in the group stage.

Format

In the group stage, each group is played on a home-and-away round-robin basis. The teams are ranked according to the following criteria: 1. Points (3 points for a win, 1 point for a draw, and 0 points for a loss); 2. Goal difference; 3. Goals scored; 4. Away goals scored; 5. CONMEBOL ranking (Regulations Article 2.4.2).

The winners of each group advanced to the round of 16 of the final stages.

Schedule
The schedule of each matchday was as follows (Regulations Article 2.2.2):

Groups

Group A

Group B

Group C

Group D

Group E

Group F

Group G

Group H

Notes

References

External links
CONMEBOL Sudamericana 2022, CONMEBOL.com
CONMEBOL Sudamericana

2
April 2022 sports events in South America
May 2022 sports events in South America